Methanedithiol is an organosulfur compound with the formula H2C(SH)2.  It forms when formaldehyde is treated with hydrogen sulfide under pressure.  The reaction competes with formation of trithiane.  The compound forms a solid dibenzoate upon treatment with benzoic anhydride.

References

Thiols
Functional groups
Organosulfur compounds
Foul-smelling chemicals